Every railway line in Poland has its own number, with the lowest numbers attached to the most important and most strategic routes.

Line number 1 links Warsaw Centralna with Katowice Central Station, while line number 999, the last one on the list, is a side track, joining Piła Main with a secondary-importance station of Piła North (Pila Północ).

A very detailed MAP OF RAILWAY LINES OF POLAND may be downloaded from the website 'Polskie Linie Kolejowe - Mapy.
Six different maps are available, each of which can be downloaded by clicking on 'POBIERZ.' The first map is the most detailed, showing all railway stations in Poland, with each line labelled by its line number.

See also the German Wikipedia article Liste der Eisenbahnstrecken in Polen for fuller details.

List

References

 
Transport in Poland

de:Kategorie:Bahnstrecke in Polen